The 2014 FIFA Ballon d'Or Gala was the fifth year for FIFA's awards for the top football players and coaches of the year. The awards were given out in Zürich on 12 January 2015.

Real Madrid and Portugal forward Cristiano Ronaldo won the FIFA Ballon d'Or as the World Player of the Year for a second consecutive time, having won it previously last year. This was his third Ballon d'Or win overall, placing him second to only Lionel Messi for the most wins in the history of the award.  Nadine Keßler was named as the Women's World Player of the Year, while Joachim Löw received the World Coach of the Year for Men's Football and Ralf Kellermann the World Coach of the Year for Women's Football. The ceremony was hosted by Kate Abdo.

Winners and nominees
In late October 2014, the FIFA revealed shortlists for the FIFA Ballon d'Or, FIFA Women's World Player of the Year, and FIFA World Coaches of the Year. The shortlists for the women's awards were revealed on 24 October, and the men's shortlists were revealed on 28 October.

FIFA Ballon d'Or

The results for the 2014 FIFA Ballon d'Or were:

The following 20 men were originally in contention for the 2014 FIFA Ballon d'Or:

FIFA Puskás Award

 James Rodríguez, 1–0 vs , Maracanã Stadium, 28 June 2014

FIFA Presidential Award
 Hiroshi Kagawa, former Japanese footballer and current sports journalist.

FIFA Fair Play Award
2014 FIFA World Cup volunteers

FIFA/FIFPro World XI

FIFA Women's World Player of the Year
The following 10 players were named to the shortlist for the FIFA Women's World Player of the Year award:

FIFA World Coach of the Year for Men's Football
The following 10 managers were named to the shortlist for the FIFA World Coach of the Year for Men's Football:

FIFA World Coach of the Year for Women's Football
The following 10 managers were named to the shortlist for the FIFA World Coach of the Year for Women's Football:

References

External links

FIFA Ballon
FIFA Ballon d'Or
FIFA Ballon
Women's association football trophies and awards
2014 in women's association football